Sir Simon Fraser may refer to:

 Sir Simon Fraser (died 1306), fought in the Wars of Scottish Independence
 Sir Simon Fraser (Australian politician) (1832–1919), member of the Australian Senate
 Sir Simon Fraser (diplomat) (born 1958), British Permanent Under-Secretary of the Foreign and Commonwealth Office 2010–2015

See also
 Simon Fraser (disambiguation)